East Hanover Township is the name of some places in the U.S. state of Pennsylvania:
East Hanover Township, Dauphin County, Pennsylvania
East Hanover Township, Lebanon County, Pennsylvania

See also
Hanover Township, Pennsylvania (disambiguation)
New Hanover Township, Pennsylvania
South Hanover Township, Pennsylvania
Upper Hanover Township, Pennsylvania
West Hanover Township, Pennsylvania

Pennsylvania township disambiguation pages